Chris Janssens (born 8 November 1977 in Genk) is a Flemish politician for Vlaams Belang, a member of the Flemish Parliament and the current chairman of the VB's faction in the Flemish Parliament.

Biography  
Janssens worked as a notary public officer prior to his political career. He first joined the former Vlaams Blok party when he was a teenager, citing concerns with social integration and multiculturalism. Janssens was first elected as a representative for the Vlaams Belang party to the Flemish parliament in 2009 for the Limburg constituency, and was re-elected in 2014 and 2019. Janssens has also been a city councilor in Genk since 2007. In November 2020, Janssens received death threats on social media for calling for an end to Turkish funding of mosques in Belgium. At the same time, fellow Genk based Flemish politician and New Flemish Alliance member Zuhal Demir also received threats via email for making similar statements. Janssens subsequently filed a complaint with the police.

References 

Living people

Members of the Flemish Parliament

1977 births
Vlaams Belang politicians
21st-century Belgian politicians